Domenico de Dominicis or Domenico de Dominici (died 1478) was a Roman Catholic prelate who served as Bishop of Brescia (1464–1478)
and Bishop of Torcello (1448–1464).

Biography
On 20 February 1448, Domenico de Dominicis was appointed during the papacy of Pope Nicholas V as Bishop of Torcello.
On 14 November 1464, he was appointed during the papacy of Pope Paul II as Bishop of Brescia.
He served as Bishop of Brescia until his death in 1478. While bishop, he was the principal consecrator of Johannes Hinderbach, Bishop of Trento (1466); and the principal co-consecrator of Giovanni Stefano Botticelli, Bishop of Cremona (1467).

References

External links and additional sources
  (for Chronology of Bishops) 
  (for Chronology of Bishops) 

15th-century Roman Catholic bishops in the Republic of Venice
Bishops appointed by Pope Nicholas V
Bishops appointed by Pope Paul II
1478 deaths